The men's alpine skiing slalom event was part of the alpine skiing at the 1948 Winter Olympics programme. It was the first appearance of the event. The competition consisted of was held on Thursday, February 5, 1948. Seventy-seven alpine skiers from 22 nations competed.

Medalists

Results

Silvio Alverà set the best time in the first heat, but finished without a medal. Edy Reinalter who was third after the first heat, set the fastest time in the second run and won the gold medal.

* 5 seconds penalty added. ** 10 seconds penalty added.

References

External links
Official Olympic Report
 

Men's alpine skiing at the 1948 Winter Olympics